Ochojec is a district of Rybnik, Silesian Voivodeship, southern Poland. In the late 2013 it had about 2,000 inhabitants.

History 
The village was first mentioned in 1291.

After World War I in the Upper Silesia plebiscite 231 out of 283 voters in Ochojec voted in favour of joining Poland, against 52 opting for staying in Germany.

In years 1973-1977 it was a seat of gmina, which was on May 27, 1975 amalgamated with Rybnik.

The village became a seat of a Catholic parish in 2012.

References

Districts of Rybnik